Charles Webb (born 26 November 1821, Sudbury, Suffolk, England – 23 January 1898) was an architect working in Victoria, Australia during the 19th century. Notable Webb designs include the iconic Windsor Hotel, Royal Arcade, South Melbourne Town Hall and Tasma Terrace, all listed on the Victorian Heritage Register.

Biography
Charles Webb was born in Sudbury, Suffolk, England on 26 November 1821, as the youngest of nine children. After being apprentice at an architect in London, in 1847 he became the secretary of the London Architectural Students' Society. Following his brother James who earlier migrated to Australia, Charles arrived in Melbourne on 2 June 1849. He set up an architecture and surveyor partnership with his brother at Brighton. Their first important commission was for the St Paul's Church on Swanston Street in 1850. After 1858 Webb practised on his own, until two of his sons joined him in 1888. In this period he designed several public buildings, including the Wesley College (1864), Alfred Hospital (1869), Royal Arcade (1869), South Melbourne Town Hall (1878), Melbourne Orphan Asylum (1878) and the Grand Hotel later renamed Hotel Windsor (1884). In 1856 he was a founding member of the Victorian Institute of Architects, and between 1882-83 the organisation's president.

Significant works
 1856 - Melbourne Grammar School (main buildings), Melbourne
 1857 - St Andrew's Anglican Church, Brighton, Melbourne
 1863 - Church of Christ, Swanston Street, Melbourne
 1864 - Wesley College, Prahran, Melbourne
 1869 - Royal Arcade, Bourke Street, Melbourne
 1872 - The Beehive Building, Pall Mall, Bendigo
 1875 - Congregational Church, Black St., Brighton, Melbourne
 1876 - Mandeville Hall, Toorak, Melbourne
 1876 - John Knox Presbyterian Church, Gardenvale, Melbourne
 1878 - Tasma Terrace, Parliament Place, East Melbourne
 1879 - South Melbourne Town Hall, South Melbourne
 1880 - Primary School No. 1253, South Melbourne
 1882 - Mosspennoch, East Melbourne
 1883 - Grand Hotel (Windsor), Spring Street, Melbourne
 1884 - Banks & Co Warehouse, 96 Pelham Street, Carlton, Melbourne
 1889 - Charsfield Hotel, St Kilda Road, Melbourne

Gallery of works

References

External links

1821 births
1898 deaths
People from Sudbury, Suffolk
19th-century Australian architects
English emigrants to colonial Australia
Architects from Melbourne